Enoplognatha is a genus of comb-footed spiders that was first described by P. Pavesi in 1880. They have both a large colulus and a subspherical abdomen. Males usually have enlarged chelicerae. It is considered a senior synonym of Symopagia.

Among the theridiids, they are medium to large sized.

Species
 it contains seventy-four species with a cosmopolitan distribution, including Greenland and Western Australia:

E. abrupta (Karsch, 1879) – Russia (Far East), China, Korea, Japan
E. afrodite Hippa & Oksala, 1983 – Southern Europe
E. almeriensis Bosmans & Van Keer, 1999 – Portugal, Spain
E. angkora Barrion, Barrion-Dupo & Heong, 2013 – China
E. apaya Barrion & Litsinger, 1995 – Philippines
E. bidens Simon, 1908 – Australia (Western Australia)
E. biskrensis Denis, 1945 – Morocco, Algeria, Tunisia
E. bobaiensis Zhu, 1998 – China
E. bryjai Řezáč, 2016 – Czechia
E. cariasoi Barrion & Litsinger, 1995 – Philippines
E. caricis (Fickert, 1876) – Europe, Turkey, Russia (Europe to Far East), China, Korea, Japan
E. carinata Bosmans & Van Keer, 1999 – Morocco, Algeria
E. daweiensis Yin & Yan, 2012 – China
E. deserta Levy & Amitai, 1981 – Morocco to Israel, Russia (Europe)
E. diodonta Zhu & Zhang, 1992 – Pakistan, India, China
E. diversa (Blackwall, 1859) – Canary Is., Madeira, Portugal, Spain, France, Morocco to Greece
E. franzi Wunderlich, 1995 – Mediterranean, Iraq
E. fuyangensis Barrion & He, 2017 – China
E. gemina Bosmans & Van Keer, 1999 – Mediterranean to Azerbaijan
E. gershomi Bosmans & Van Keer, 1999 – Israel
E. giladensis (Levy & Amitai, 1982) – Greece (Rhodes), Turkey, Israel, Azerbaijan
E. goulouensis Yin & Yan, 2012 – China
E. gramineusa Zhu, 1998 – China
E. hermani Bosmans & Van Keer, 1999 – Algeria
E. inornata O. Pickard-Cambridge, 1904 – South Africa
E. intrepida (Sørensen, 1898) – USA, Canada, Greenland, Korea
E. iraqi Najim, Al-Hadlak & Seyyar, 2015 – Iraq, Iran
E. joshua Chamberlin & Ivie, 1942 – USA
E. juninensis (Keyserling, 1884) – Peru
E. kalaykayina Barrion & Litsinger, 1995 – Philippines
E. latimana Hippa & Oksala, 1982 – Canada, Europe, North Africa, Turkey, Caucasus, Russia (Europe) to Central Asia, Iran
E. lordosa Zhu & Song, 1992 – China, Japan
E. macrochelis Levy & Amitai, 1981 – North Macedonia, Greece, Turkey, Cyprus, Israel, Azerbaijan, Iran
E. malapahabanda Barrion & Litsinger, 1995 – Philippines
E. mandibularis (Lucas, 1846) (type) – Europe, North Africa, Turkey, Israel, Russia (Europe) to Central Asia, Iran, China
E. mangshan Yin, 2012 – China
E. margarita Yaginuma, 1964 – Kazakhstan, Russia (Central Asia to Far East), China, Korea, Japan
E. mariae Bosmans & Van Keer, 1999 – Greece, Russia (Caucasus)
E. maricopa Levi, 1962 – USA
E. marmorata (Hentz, 1850) – North America
E. maysanga Barrion & Litsinger, 1995 – Philippines
E. mediterranea Levy & Amitai, 1981 – Turkey, Cyprus, Israel, Azerbaijan, Iran
E. melanicruciata Saito, 1939 – Japan
E. molesta O. Pickard-Cambridge, 1904 – South Africa
E. monstrabilis Marusik & Logunov, 2002 – Russia (South Siberia)
E. mordax (Thorell, 1875) – Europe, North Africa, Turkey, Caucasus, Russia (Europe) to Tajikistan, Iran, China
E. nigromarginata (Lucas, 1846) – Spain to Greece, Morocco, Algeria
E. oelandica (Thorell, 1875) – Europe, Caucasus, Kazakhstan, China
E. oreophila (Simon, 1894) – Sri Lanka
E. orientalis Schenkel, 1963 – China
E. ovata (Clerck, 1757) – North America, Europe, Turkey, Caucasus, Russia (Europe to Middle Siberia), Kazakhstan, Iran, Central Asia, Japan
E. parathoracica Levy & Amitai, 1981 – Turkey, Israel, Azerbaijan
E. penelope Hippa & Oksala, 1982 – Bulgaria, Greece (incl. Crete)
E. peruviana Chamberlin, 1916 – Peru
E. philippinensis Barrion & Litsinger, 1995 – Philippines
E. procerula Simon, 1909 – South Africa
E. pulatuberculata Barrion & Litsinger, 1995 – Philippines
E. puno Levi, 1962 – Peru
E. qiuae Zhu, 1998 – China
E. quadripunctata Simon, 1885 – Mediterranean, Caucasus, Kazakhstan
E. robusta Thorell, 1898 – Myanmar
E. sattleri Bösenberg, 1895 – Madeira, Salvages, Canary Is.
E. selma Chamberlin & Ivie, 1946 – USA
E. serratosignata (L. Koch, 1879) – Europe, Caucasus, Russia (Europe to Far East), Kazakhstan, China
E. tadzhica Sytshevskaja, 1975 – Tajikistan
E. testacea Simon, 1884 – Southern, Central Europe to Central Asia
E. thoracica (Hahn, 1833) – North America, Europe, Turkey, North Africa, Syria, Iran, Turkmenistan
E. turkestanica Charitonov, 1946 – Iran, Central Asia
E. tuybaana Barrion & Litsinger, 1995 – Philippines
E. verae Bosmans & Van Keer, 1999 – Morocco, Spain, Tunisia, Italy, Greece
E. wyuta Chamberlin & Ivie, 1942 – USA
E. yelpantrapensis Barrion & Litsinger, 1995 – Philippines
E. yizhangensis Yin, 2012 – China
E. zapfeae Levi, 1962 – Chile

In synonymy:

E. aituarca Esyunin & Efimik, 1998 = Enoplognatha serratosignata (L. Koch, 1879)
E. albimaculosa (Saito, 1934, T from Steatoda) = Enoplognatha caricis (Fickert, 1876)
E. ambigua Kulczyński, 1894 = Enoplognatha serratosignata (L. Koch, 1879)
E. arganoi (Brignoli, 1980, T from Robertus) = Enoplognatha testacea Simon, 1884
E. camtschadalica Kulczyński, 1885 = Enoplognatha caricis (Fickert, 1876)
E. corollata (Bertkau, 1883) = Enoplognatha oelandica (Thorell, 1875)
E. cottarellii (Brignoli, 1980) = Enoplognatha testacea Simon, 1884
E. crucifera (Thorell, 1875) = Enoplognatha mordax (Thorell, 1875)
E. dorsinotata Bösenberg & Strand, 1906 = Enoplognatha caricis (Fickert, 1876)
E. elimata (L. Koch, 1882, T from Theridion) = Enoplognatha diversa (Blackwall, 1859)
E. hangzhouensis Zhu, 1998 = Enoplognatha abrupta (Karsch, 1879)
E. hungarica Kolosváry, 1934 = Enoplognatha serratosignata (L. Koch, 1879)
E. jacksoni Schenkel, 1927 = Enoplognatha serratosignata (L. Koch, 1879)
E. japonica Bösenberg & Strand, 1906 = Enoplognatha caricis (Fickert, 1876)
E. joshua Chamberlin & Ivie, 1942 = Enoplognatha joshua Chamberlin & Ivie, 1942
E. krasnojarskensis (Strand, 1903, removed from S of Theridion undulatum) = Enoplognatha serratosignata (L. Koch, 1879)
E. mansueta (L. Koch, 1882, T from Theridion) = Enoplognatha mandibularis (Lucas, 1846)
E. maritima Simon, 1884 = Enoplognatha mordax (Thorell, 1875)
E. marmorata Chamberlin & Ivie, 1942 = Enoplognatha marmorata (Hentz, 1850)
E. militaris Wunderlich, 1995 = Enoplognatha latimana Hippa & Oksala, 1982
E. mimoides (Chamberlin, 1920) = Enoplognatha marmorata (Hentz, 1850)
E. nigrocincta Simon, 1884 = Enoplognatha mandibularis (Lucas, 1846)
E. pikes Chamberlin & Ivie, 1942 = Enoplognatha intrepida (Sørensen, 1898)
E. piuta Chamberlin & Ivie, 1942 = Enoplognatha joshua Chamberlin & Ivie, 1942
E. puritana Chamberlin & Ivie, 1942 = Enoplognatha caricis (Fickert, 1876)
E. redimita (Linnaeus, 1758, T from Theridion) = Enoplognatha ovata (Clerck, 1757)
E. robustula Roewer, 1942 = Enoplognatha diversa (Blackwall, 1859)
E. rugosa Emerton, 1908 = Enoplognatha intrepida (Sørensen, 1898)
E. schaufussi (L. Koch, 1882) = Enoplognatha mordax (Thorell, 1875)
E. submargarita Yaginuma & Zhu, 1992 = Enoplognatha margarita Yaginuma, 1964
E. tecta Keyserling, 1884 = Enoplognatha caricis (Fickert, 1876)
E. thoracicoides Nosek, 1905 = Enoplognatha quadripunctata Simon, 1884
E. transversifoveata (Bösenberg & Strand, 1906) = Enoplognatha abrupta (Karsch, 1879)

See also
 List of Theridiidae species

References

External links

Theridiidae
Araneomorphae genera
Cosmopolitan spiders